Harry Lee Maynard (June 8, 1861 – October 23, 1922) was a U.S. Representative from Virginia.

Biography
Born in Portsmouth, Virginia, Maynard attended the common schools of Norfolk County.
He was graduated from the Virginia Agricultural and Mechanical College at Blacksburg in 1880. He engaged in the real estate business and the promotion of public utilities. He served as member of the State house of delegates in 1889 and 1890. He served in the State senate in 1893–1901.

Maynard was elected as a Democrat to the Fifty-seventh and to the four succeeding Congresses (March 4, 1901 – March 3, 1911).
He was an unsuccessful candidate for renomination in 1910.
He moved to New York City and engaged in the insurance and real estate business.
He died in Fort Totten, New York, October 23, 1922.
He was interred in Oak Grove Cemetery, Portsmouth, Virginia.

Electoral history

1900; Maynard was elected to the U.S. House of Representatives defeating Republican Richard A. Wise, Socialist Labor James B. Flynn, and Labor C.C. Williams, winning 62.21% of the vote.
1902; Maynard was re-elected defeating Republican Robert M. Hughes and Socialists Lewis A. Hall and P.A. Wiggins, winning 75.94% of the vote.
1904; Maynard was re-elected defeating Republican Hughes, Socialist Lewis A. Hall, and Socialist Godfrey Kinder, winning 78.34% of the vote.
1906; Maynard was re-elected defeating Republican Floyd Hughes, winning 99.98% of the vote.
1908; Maynard was re-elected defeating Republican D.L. Groner and Socialist W.B. Muller, winning 70.3% of the vote.

Sources

1861 births
1922 deaths
Democratic Party members of the United States House of Representatives from Virginia
Virginia Tech alumni
Politicians from Portsmouth, Virginia
Democratic Party Virginia state senators
Democratic Party members of the Virginia House of Delegates
20th-century American politicians